This page lists notable bicycle brands and manufacturing companies past and present. For bicycle parts, see List of bicycle part manufacturing companies.

Many bicycle brands do not manufacture their own product, but rather import and re-brand bikes manufactured by others (e.g., Nishiki), sometimes designing the bike, specifying the equipment, and providing quality control. There are also brands that have, at different times, been manufacturers as well as re-branders: a company with manufacturing capability may market models made by other (overseas) factories, while simultaneously manufacturing bicycles in-house, for example, high-end models.

Only brands or manufacturers that are notable as a bicycle brand should be included. If no page exists for the company or brand, then the page to be linked to should be created first or a reference provided as to its notability or the entry will probably be removed.

International manufacturers 
Bicycle manufacturers are in many cases members of "Groups", i.e. they have several product names - so-called "brands". Examples include the following:
 Cycleurope AB based in Stockholm (Sweden),
 Derby Cycle Corporation in Cloppenburg (Germany), and
 Dorel Sports, a division of the Dutch Pon Holdings

0—9 
 3T Cycling - Italy

A 

 A-bike - UK
 Abici - Italy
 Adler - Germany (defunct)
 AIST - Belarus
 ALAN - Italy
 Al Carter - UK (defunct)
 Alcyon - France (defunct)
 Alldays & Onions - UK (defunct)
 American Bicycle Company - USA (defunct)
 American Bicycle Group - USA, owns Litespeed, Quintana Roo, and Obed Bikes
 American Eagle - USA (defunct, original name of Nishiki)
 American Machine and Foundry  - USA (widely known as AMF) (defunct), formerly owned Roadmaster.
 American Star Bicycle - USA (defunct) manufactured by the H. B. Smith Machine Company
 Aprilia - Italy (Started as a bicycle manufacturing unit at Noale, Italy but now manufactures Scooters and Motorcycles)
 Argon 18 - Canada
 Ariel - England (defunct)
 Atala - Italy
 Author - Czech Republic
 Avanti - New Zealand

B 

 Baltik vairas - Lithuania
 Bacchetta - USA
 Barnes Cycle Company - USA (defunct)
 Basso_Bikes - Italy
 Batavus - Netherlands
 Battaglin - Italy
 Berlin & Racycle Manufacturing Company - Canada (defunct)
 BH - Spain
 Bianchi - Italy
 Bickerton - UK (folding bikes)
 Bike Friday - USA (Green Gear Cycling Co.) (folding bikes)
 Bilenky - USA
 Biomega - Denmark
 Birdy - Germany  (folding bikes)
 BMC - Switzerland
 Boardman Bikes - UK
 Bohemian Bicycles - USA
 Bontrager - USA (bought by Trek and converted into a component brand)
 Bootie - UK
 Bottecchia - Italy
 Bradbury - UK (defunct)
 Brasil & Movimento - Brazil (Branded as Sundown)
 Brennabor - Germany (defunct)
 Bridgestone - Japan
 British Eagle - UK
 Brodie Bicycles - Canada
 Brompton Bicycle - UK (folding bikes)
 Brunswick - USA, formerly owned Roadmaster
 BSA - UK, no longer builds bicycles, TI of India builds BSA branded bikes.
 B’Twin
 Burley Design - USA (no longer make bicycles)

C 

 Calcott Brothers - UK (defunct)
 Calfee Design - USA
 Caloi - Brazil
 Campion Cycle Company - UK
 Cannondale - an American division of Dorel Sports
 Canyon bicycles - Germany
 Catrike - USA (Recumbent trikes)
 CCM - Canada
 Centurion - Japan
 Cervélo - Canada
 Chater-Lea - UK
 Chicago Bicycle Company - USA (defunct)
 Cilo - Switzerland
 Cinelli - Italy
 Citizen Bike - USA (folding bikes)
 Clark-Kent - USA (defunct)
 Claud Butler - UK
 Clément - France (defunct)
 Co-Motion Cycles - USA
 Coker - USA
 Colnago - Italy
 Columbia Bicycles - USA
 Corima - France
 Cortina Cycles - USA
 Coventry-Eagle- UK (defunct - see Falcon Cycles)
 Cruzbike - USA, recumbent
 Cube - Germany
 Currys - UK, no longer makes bicycles
 Cycle Force Group - USA
 Cycles Devinci - Canada
 Cycleuropa Group - Sweden, manufactures such brands as: Bianchi, Crescent, DBS, Everton, Gitane, Kildemoes, Legnano, Micmo, Monark, Puch, Spectra, and Cyclepro.
 Cyfac - France

D 

 Dahon - USA / China
 Dawes Cycles - UK
 Defiance Cycle Company
 Demorest - USA (restructured as Lycoming Foundry and Machine Company and discontinued bicycle manufacturing)
 Den Beste Sykkel Better known as DBS - Norway
 Derby Cycle - Germany, owns Kalkhoff, Focus, Nishiki, Rixe, Raleigh and Univega
 De Rosa - Italy
 Cycles Devinci - Canada  (not to be confused with daVinci Designs of  USA, who make tandems.)
 Di Blasi Industriale - Italy
 Diamant - Norway. Unrelated brand of same name from Germany, owned by Trek
 Diamondback Bicycles - USA
 Dolan Bikes - UK
 Dorel Sports - Canada, owns Pacific Cycle and markets under brand names including Cannondale, Iron Horse, Schwinn, Mongoose, Roadmaster, and GT.
 Dunelt - UK (defunct)
 Dynacraft - USA, owns Magna and Next

E 

 Eagle Bicycle Manufacturing Company - USA (defunct)
 Eddy Merckx Cycles - Belgium
 Electra Bicycle Company - USA (Owned by Trek Bicycle Company)
 Ellis Briggs - UK
 Ellsworth Handcrafted Bicycles - USA
 Emilio Bozzi - Italy (acquired by Bianchi)
 Ērenpreiss Bicycles - Latvia
 Excelsior - UK (defunct)

F 

 Falcon Cycles - UK
 Fat City Cycles - USA (defunct)
 Felt - USA
 Flying Pigeon - China
 Flying Scot - Scotland
 Focus Bikes - Germany.  Part of Derby Cycle
 Cycles Follis - France (defunct)
 Folmer & Schwing - USA (defunct)
 Fondriest - Italy
 Fram - Sweden (defunct)
 Freddie Grubb - UK
 Fuji Bikes - USA (owned by Advanced Sports International)
 Fyxation - USA

G 

 Gary Fisher - USA (owned by TREK)
 Gazelle - Netherlands
 Gendron Bicycles - USA
 Genesis - UK
 Gepida - Hungary
 Ghost - Germany ((acquired by Accell, made in Taiwan))
 Giant Manufacturing - Taiwan Manufacturers its own bikes and many other brands
 Gimson - Spain (defunct)
 Gitane - France
 Gladiator Cycle Company - France (defunct)
 Gnome et Rhône - France (defunct)
 Gocycle - UK
 Gormully & Jeffery - USA (defunct)
 Gräf & Stift - Austria (defunct)
 GT Bicycles - American brand now owned by Dorel Sports
 Guerciotti - Italy
 Gustavs Ērenpreis Bicycle Factory - Latvia (defunct)
 Gunnar - USA

H 

 Halfords - U.K. 
 Harley-Davidson - USA, 1917–1923.
 Haro Bikes - USA, owns the Masi brand.
 Harry Quinn - UK (defunct)
 Hase bikes - Germany
 Heinkel - Germany (defunct)
 Helkama - Finland
 Henley Bicycle Works - USA (defunct)
 Hercules - UK (defunct)
 Hercules - Germany
 Hero Cycles Ltd - India - owning brands such as  Hero, Hawk, Firefox and Roma
 René Herse - France
 Hetchins - UK
 Hillman - UK (defunct)
 Hoffman BMX Bikes
 Hoffmann - Germany (defunct)
 Holdsworth - UK
 Huffy - USA
 Humber - UK part of Raleigh
 Hurtu - France (defunct)
 Husqvarna - Sweden (no longer a bicycle manufacturer)
 Hutch BMX BMX Bicycle manufacturer USA

I 

 Ibis - USA
 Ideal Bikes - Greece
 Indian - USA (bought by Polaris)
 IFA - East Germany (defunct)
 Independent Fabrication - USA
 Inspired Cycle Engineering (ICE) - UK (recumbent trikes)
 Iride - Italy
 Iron Horse Bicycles - American brand now owned by Dorel Sports
 Islabikes – UK
 Italvega - USA (defunct) Precursor to Univega
 Itera - Sweden (defunct)
 Ivel Cycle Works - UK (defunct)
 Iver Johnson - USA (defunct)
 Iverson - USA (defunct)

J 
 Jan Janssen - The Netherlands
 JMC Bicycles - USA (defunct)
 Jamis Bicycles- USA

K 

 Kalkhoff - Germany
 Kangaroo - UK
 Karbon Kinetics Limited - UK
 K2 Sports - USA
 Kent - USA
 Kestrel USA - USA (owned by Advanced Sports International)
 Kettler - Germany
 KHS - Taiwan A Manufacturer of its own bikes plus many other brands
 Kia - ROK, no longer produces bicycles
 Kinesis Industry - Taiwan and USA, Kenesis produces its own bikes as well as brands manufactured by Kinesis include Diamondback Bicycles, Felt Bicycles, GT Bicycles, Schwinn, Jamis, K2, Raleigh, Trek, and Kona
 Klein - USA (Discontinued brand owned by Trek)
 Koga Miyata - The Netherlands
 Kogswell Cycles - USA
 Kona - USA
 Kronan - Sweden
 Kross - Poland
 KTM - Austria
 Kuota - Italy
 Kuwahara - Japan (Okinawa)

L 

 Laurin & Klement - Austria-Hungary/Czech republic
 Lapierre - France
 LeMond - USA (Discontinued brand owned by Trek)
 Alexander Leutner & Co. — Russia (defunct)
 Lightning Cycle Dynamics - USA (recumbent bicycles)
 Litespeed - USA
 Look - France
 Louison Bobet - France (defunct)
 Lotus,  USA (defunct)

M 

 Magna - USA
 Malvern Star - Australia
 Marin Bikes - USA
 Masi Bicycles - USA
 Matchless - UK (defunct)
 Matra - France
 Melon Bicycles - USA
 Mercian Cycles - UK
 Merida Bikes - Taiwan
 Merlin - USA
 Merckx - Belgium
 Milwaukee Bicycle Co. - USA
 Minerva - Belgium (defunct)
 Miyata - Japan
 Mochet - France (defunct)
 Monark - Sweden/Brazil/Peru
 Mondia - Switzerland
 Mongoose - American brand now owned by Dorel Sports
 Montague - USA
 Moots Cycles - CO, USA
 Motobécane - France
 Moulton - UK
 Mountain Equipment Co-op - Canada
 Murray - USA (defunct)
 Muddy Fox - UK (other brand: Silver Fox)

N 

 Nagasawa - Japan
 National - Japan, precursor to Panasonic
 Neil Pryde - Hong Kong
 Neobike - Taiwan
 NEXT - USA
 Nishiki -  USA and Europe
 Norco - Canada
 Norman Cycles - UK (defunct)
 Novara - USA
 NSU - Germany
 Nymanbolagen - Sweden

O 
 Olive Wheel Company - USA (defunct)
 Olmo - Italy
 Opel - Germany (no longer makes bicycles)
 Orbea - Spain
 Órbita - Portugal
 Orient Bikes - Greece
 Overman Wheel Company - USA (defunct)

P 

 Pacific Cycle - USA, was acquired by Dorel Sports in 2004. Owns GT, Mongoose, Murray, Roadmaster, and Schwinn brands
 Pacific Cycles - Pacific Cycles is a Taiwan bicycle manufacturing company based in Hsin Wu, Taoyuan, Taiwan.
 Panasonic - Japan, successor to National
 Pashley Cycles - UK
 Pedersen bicycle - UK
 Pegas - RO
 Peugeot - France
 Phillips Cycles - UK
 Phoenix - China
 Pierce Cycle Company - USA (defunct)
 Pinarello - Italy
 Planet X Bikes - UK, On-One, Titus, Planet X
 Pocket Bicycles - USA
 Pogliaghi - Italy
 Polygon Bikes - Indonesia
 Pope Manufacturing Company - USA (defunct)
 Premier - UK (defunct)
 Prophete - Germany
 Puch - Austria

Q 
 Quadrant Cycle Company - UK (defunct)
 Quality Bicycle Products - USA and Taiwan, owns Salsa Cycles and Surly Bikes.
 Quintana Roo - USA

R 

 R+E Cycles - USA  also known as Rodriguez Bicycles
 Radio Flyer - USA
 Rabasa Cycles - Spain
 Raleigh - UK.  Part of Derby Cycle
 Rambler - USA (defunct), made by Gormully & Jeffery
 Rans Designs - USA
 Razor - USA
 Redline bicycles - USA
 Reid - Australia
 Rhoades Car - USA (quadracycles)
 Ridgeback - UK
 Ridley - Belgium
 Riese und Müller - Germany
 RIH - Netherlands
 Riley Cycle Company - UK (defunct)
 Rivendell Bicycle Works - USA
 Roadmaster - American brand now owned by Dorel Sports
 Roberts Cycles - UK
 Robin Hood - UK
 Rocky Mountain Bicycles - Canada
 ROMET Bike Factory - Poland
 ROSE Bikes - Germany
 Ross - USA
 Rover Company - UK
 Rowbike - USA
 Rudge-Whitworth - UK

S 

 Salcano (bicycle)- Turkey
 Samchuly - Korea
 Santa Cruz Bikes - (owed by Pon Industries Europe)
 Santana Cycles - USA (only makes tandem bicycles)
 Saracen Cycles - UK
 Maskinfabriks-aktiebolaget Scania - Sweden
 Schwinn Bicycle Company - American brand now owned by Dorel Sports
 SCOTT Sports - Switzerland
 SE Racing now SE Bikes PK Ripper and Floval Flyer maker, USA
 Serotta - USA
 Seven Cycles - USA
 Shelby Cycle Company - USA (defunct)
 Shimano - Japan
 Simpel - Switzerland
 Simson - Germany (acquired by Industrieverband Fahrzeugbau, now defunct)
 Sinclair Research - UK
 Singer - UK (defunct)
 Softride- USA
 Sohrab - Pakistan
 Solé Bicycle Co. - USA
 Solex - France (defunct)
 Solifer - Finland
 SOMA Fabrications - USA
 Somec - Italy
 Spacelander Bicycle - United Kingdom, later United States (defunct)
 Spalding - USA (sold/distributed bicycles during the latter part of the 19th Century)
 Sparta B.V. - Netherlands
 Specialized - USA Designer only
 Speedwell bicycles - Australia (defunct)
 Star Cycle Company - UK
 Stearns - USA (defunct)
 Stelber Cycle Corp - USA
 Stella - France
 Sterling Bicycle Co. - USA
 Steyr - Austria (defunct)
 Strida - UK
 Sun Cycle & Fittings Co. - UK (defunct)
 Sunbeam - UK (defunct)
 Surly Bikes - USA
 Suzuki - Japan
 Swift Folder - USA
 Swing Bike - USA (defunct)
 Syracuse Cycle Company - USA (defunct)

T 

 Tern - Taiwan
 TerraTrike - USA (recumbent tadpole trikes)
 Terrot - France (defunct)
 Thomas - USA (defunct)
 Time - France
 Titus - USA (defunct, since absorbed into Planet X Bikes)
 Tommaso bikes - USA
 Torker - USA
 Trek Bicycle Corporation - USA, also Klein Bikes, LeMond Racing Cycles (both discontinued) and Gary Fisher Bikes
 Trident Trikes - USA (recumbent trikes)
 Trinx - China, Taiwan, Russia, Iran, Philippines
 Triumph Cycle - UK (Owned by  Raleigh Bicycle Company)
 Triumph (TWN) - Germany
 Tube Investments - UK (owned British Cycle Corporation) No longer manufacturers bicycles
 Tunturi - Finland
 Turner Suspension Bicycles - USA

U 
 Univega - US.  Part of Derby Cycle
 Urago - France (defunct)

V 

 Van Dessel Sports - USA
 Velocite Bikes - Taiwan
 Velomotors - Russia
 VéloSoleX - France (Velosolex America markets the VELOSOLEX worldwide.)
 Velo Vie - USA
 Victoria - Germany
 Villiger - Switzerland, part of Trek
 Villy Customs - USA
 Vindec - UK
 Vitus - France
 Volae - USA, recumbent bicycles
 Volagi - USA

W 

 Wanderer - Germany (defunct)
 Waverley Cycles Manufactured by Indiana Bicycle Company USA
 Waterford Precision Cycles - USA,
 Western Wheel Works Indiana USA built the Crescent brand
 Whippet - UK
 Wilderness Trail Bikes - USA
 Wilier Triestina - Italy
 Witcomb Cycles - UK
 Wittson Custom Ti Cycles - Lithuania
 Worksman Cycles - USA, also imports Atlantic Coast Cruiser brand.
 Wright Cycle Company - USA (defunct)
 Whyte - UK

X 
 Xootr - USA

Y 
 Yamaguchi Bicycles - USA
 Yamaha - Japan
 Yeti Cycles - USA

Z 
 Zigo - USA
 Zündapp - Germany

See also 
 Head badges
 List of bicycle part manufacturers
 List of BMX bicycle manufacturers
 List of electric bicycle brands and manufacturers
 List of Australian bicycle brands and manufacturers
 List of Japanese bicycle brands and manufacturers
 Outline of cycling

References 

Cycling-related lists

Lists of manufacturers
Transport lists
Lists of brands